Bibo or BIBO may refer to:

People
 Bibo Bergeron, French animator and film director
 Erdal Bibo (born 1977), Turkish basketball player
 Irving Bibo (1889–1962), American composer, songwriter, and publisher
 István Bibó (1911–1979), Hungarian lawyer, civil servant, politician and political theorist
 Solomon Bibo (1853–1934), Jewish trader in the American Old West
 Gerhard Fischer (bobsleigh), German bobsledder
 Mahmoud El Khatib (nicknamed "Bibo"; born 1954), Egyptian retired footballer

Other
 Bibliographic Ontology (BIBO), in information science
 Bibo (soft drink), produced by The Coca-Cola Company and sold in Africa
 Bibo and Beshir, an Egyptian film
 BIBO stability, a concept in signal processing
 Bibo, New Mexico, an unincorporated community in the United States
 Bibo language, a language of Papua New Guinea
 FC Bibo, an Ivorian football team
 Bulk In/Bags Out, a type of bulk carrier
 Bus In Bus Out, a form of Fly-in fly-out commuting work.